The spotted dusky salamander (Desmognathus conanti) is a species of salamander in the family Plethodontidae. It is endemic to the United States.

Taxonomy 
Desmognathus conanti was described in 1958 by Douglas A. Rossman, but was later reclassified as a subspecies of the northern dusky salamander (D. fuscus). However, numerous genetic and morphological studies since then have affirmed it as being a distinct species. In addition, genetic studies indicate that D. conanti is paraphyletic with respect to the Santeetlah dusky salamander (D. santeelah), which lies nested within it; thus, D. conanti itself likely represents a species complex of multiple undescribed cryptic species.

Distribution 
Desmognathus conanti has a wide range in the southeastern and south-central United States, ranging from southern Illinois south to the panhandle of Florida, and west to Louisiana and southern Arkansas.

Description 

Desmognathus conanti is a moderately stout salamander with a moderately keeled tail. It has several pairs of golden spots on the dorsum that may sometimes fuse to form a light dorsal stripe in adults. The belly is light with dark flecks. It closely resembles D. fuscus and D. santeetlah, and is thus best distinguished from them by range.

References 

conanti
Amphibians of the United States
Endemic fauna of the United States
Amphibians described in 1958
Taxa named by Douglas A. Rossman